Mykola Hryhorovych Kholodny (22 June 1882 – 4 May 1953) was an influential microbiologist who worked at the University of Kyiv, Ukraine in the USSR during the 1930s.

He is known for the Cholodny–Went model, which he developed independently with Frits Warmolt Went of the California Institute of Technology.
Despite being associated with the same theory, the two men never actually met.

Cholodny worked in the A.V. Fomin Botanical Garden, attached to the University of Kyiv.
He was one of the pioneers of the concept that microbes adhere to surfaces, 
using the technique of first placing glass slides in earth for a measured time period,
then using a microscope to examine the slides.
The Prokaryote Leptothrix cholodnii is named after him. 
In 1927 Cholodny proposed that the cells of the coleoptile are first polarized under the influence of uneven exposure to light, so growth hormone can diffuse more rapidly towards the side in the shade than in any other direction.
Went reached the same conclusion in 1928, and the two scientists' names have been attached to the controversial Cholodny–Went theory.

Bibliography

Selected works include:
1926 Die eisenbakterien : bieträge zu einer monographie by N Cholodny 
1928 Über eine vermeintliche Anomalie im Wachstumsmodus der Wurzeln von Lupinus albus by N Cholodny
1932 Lichtwachstumsreaktion und Phototropismus 2 by N Cholodny
1933 Zum Problem der Bildung und physiologischen Wirkung des Wuchshormons bei den Wurzeln by N Cholodny
1939 Spezielle Methoden.

In 1937 N. G. Cholodny and E. Ch. Sankewitsch published an article on Influence of weak electric currents upon the growth of the coleoptile in Plant Physiology.
The same year he published an article on Charles Darwin and the modern theory of tropisms in Science magazine.

References

1882 births
1953 deaths
People from Tambov
People from Tambovsky Uyezd
Soviet  botanists
Members of the National Academy of Sciences of Ukraine
Recipients of the Order of Lenin